A. J. Calloway is an American entertainment reporter. He is known as the original host on 106 & Park, which originally aired on BET. After co-hosting the show for five years with Free (Marie Wright), Calloway left the show on July 28, 2005.

Career
Calloway then moved to Co-Host on the entertainment news program Extra from 2005 until February 2019. That February he was suspended while being investigated for sexual misconduct.  In July he was terminated when the show's producer Telepictures terminated him, due to the number of sexual assault allegations.

Personal
He is an alumnus of Saint Benedict's Prep in Newark, New Jersey and Howard University in Washington, D.C.

He was married to pediatrician Dr Lao Sealey from 23 April 2005 – 2007.

On 8 June 2013 he married Dionne Walker. Together they have three children: Amy Belle (12 August 2013), Ava Claire (January 2015), and Albert the third (March 2017).

References

External links

Living people
American television personalities
African-American male actors
American entertainers
Male actors from Jersey City, New Jersey
Place of birth missing (living people)
African-American television personalities
21st-century American male actors
Howard University alumni
St. Benedict's Preparatory School alumni
Entertainment journalists
21st-century African-American people
20th-century African-American people
1974 births